Count Axel Lillie, also spelled Lillje (23 July 1603 – 20 December 1662) was a Swedish soldier and politician. He was appointed Lieutenant Governor General of Pomerania in 1643, Privy Councilor in 1648, Governor General of Pomerania in 1652, Field Marshal in 1657, and Governor General of Livonia in 1661. In the Thirty Years' War (1618-1648), he commanded troops at the Battle of Leipzig, in 1642. He had Löfstad Castle built.

1603 births
1662 deaths
Field marshals of Sweden
Governors-General of Sweden
Swedish nobility
Members of the Privy Council of Sweden
Swedish Pomerania
17th-century Swedish military personnel
17th-century Swedish politicians